Puan Sri Tiara Jacquelina Eu Effendi is a Malaysian actress, film producer, musical theater producer, singer, and the founder of The Enfiniti Academy of Musical Theatre and Performing Arts. She is well-acclaimed for her role in Puteri Gunung Ledang, the biggest budget movie ever produced in Malaysia up until 2005, in which she played the lead character and sang the theme song, "Asmaradana". Aside from appearing on stage and on camera, Tiara Jacquelina also serves as the managing director of Enfiniti Vision Media, a Malaysian arts, entertainment, and television production company.

Early life and career
Jacquelina was born as Jacqueline Eu in October 1967 in Kuala Lumpur, Malaysia to a Burmese Chinese father and Indonesian Chinese mother.

She began her film career in 1988. In 1995, Jacquelina co-starred with Academy Award winner, Frances McDormand, who played the lead role in the movie, Beyond Rangoon. In the 12th Malaysia Film Festival later that year, she won the Best Actress Award for her role in the film Ringgit Kasorrga, a social drama concerning a sex scandal involving a politician and young models. In 2004, she played the title character, a legendary Javanese princess in Puteri Gunung Ledang, which gained her recognition. The movie was submitted for the Best Foreign Language Film category at the Academy Awards in 2004 but was not nominated.

Following the success of the film, she later staged it as a musical at Istana Budaya in 2006 with the title, Puteri Gunung Ledang: The Musical.

Recently, in March 2018, Jacquelina adapted and directed Ola Bola: The Musical, a theatrical musical that was staged at Istana Budaya and has received positive reviews from both the media and its viewers. The musical was staged after the movie, Ola Bola, after marking its success in Malaysian cinematography in 2016 where the story revolves around the history of Malaysian national football team in their journey of paving their way into the 1980 Summer Olympics.

Personal life

Jacquelina converted to Islam in 1993 and was previously married to actor and celebrity Hani Mohsin, from 1993 until they divorced in 1998. She is the mother of two children, Hani Karmila and Mohd Eridani.

She later married Sarawakian businessman Mohd Effendi Norwawi, who also formerly served as a senator and Minister in the Prime Minister's Department.

Awards

Achievements
 Executive Producer of the multiple-award-winning film Puteri Gunung Ledang which has garnered 11 awards at the Malaysian PPFM Oscars 2004 including Best Film, Best Producer, Cinematography, Best Actress, Costume Design, Art Direction, Best Sound b) Best Producer at the Asian 1st Films Festival 2005 c) 5 awards at the Malaysian Film Festival 2004 including best director, best screenplay, best art direction, best music score.
 Executive Producer of Puteri Gunung Ledang the Musical which won 8 wards at the 2006 Boh Cameronian Arts Awards for Best Director, Original Script (Bahasa Malaysia), Best Lighting Design, Set Design, Music and Sound Design, Costume Design, Supporting Actor, Audience's Choice Award for Theatre.
 Executive Producer of P. Ramlee the Musical which won 6 awards at the 2007 Boh Cameronian Arts Awards for Best Director, Original Script (Bahasa Malaysia), Set Design, Music and Sound Design, Best Supporting Actor, Audience's Choice Award for Theatre.

Filmography

Film

Telemovie

Web series

Television

References

External links
 
 
 New Sunday Times, Malaysia. "Tiara's true to her roles", accessmylibrary.com, 18 September 2005.

1967 births
Converts to Islam
Indonesian people of Burmese descent
Indonesian people of Chinese descent
Living people
20th-century Malaysian actresses
Malaysian socialites
Malaysian film producers
Malaysian television personalities
Malaysian Muslims
Malaysian people of Chinese descent
Malaysian people of Burmese descent
Malaysian people of Indonesian descent
People from Kuala Lumpur
21st-century Malaysian actresses
Malaysian film actresses
Malaysian stage actresses